Isla Santa Cruz, is an island in the Gulf of California, east of the Baja California Peninsula in Baja California Sur state.

The island is uninhabited and is within Loreto Municipality.

Biology
Isla Santa Cruz has six species of reptiles: Crotalus atrox (western diamond-backed rattlesnake), Lampropeltis californiae (California kingsnake), Phyllodactylus nocticolus (peninsular leaf-toed gecko), Rena humilis (western threadsnake), Sauromalus ater (common chuckwalla), and Sceloporus angustus (Isla Santa Cruz sator).

References

Further reading

Islands of Baja California Sur
Islands of the Gulf of California
Loreto Municipality (Baja California Sur)
Uninhabited islands of Mexico